The canton of Le Coteau is an administrative division of the Loire department, in eastern France. It was created at the French canton reorganisation which came into effect in March 2015. Its seat is in Le Coteau.

It consists of the following communes: 

Balbigny 
Bussières 
Chirassimont 
Commelle-Vernay 
Cordelle 
Le Coteau 
Croizet-sur-Gand 
Fourneaux 
Lay 
Machézal 
Neaux 
Néronde 
Neulise 
Notre-Dame-de-Boisset 
Parigny 
Perreux
Pinay 
Saint-Cyr-de-Favières 
Saint-Cyr-de-Valorges 
Sainte-Agathe-en-Donzy 
Sainte-Colombe-sur-Gand 
Saint-Jodard 
Saint-Just-la-Pendue 
Saint-Marcel-de-Félines 
Saint-Priest-la-Roche 
Saint-Symphorien-de-Lay 
Saint-Vincent-de-Boisset 
Vendranges 
Violay

References

Cantons of Loire (department)